Vibha Chibber is an Indian actress and theatre artist who appears in TV shows & Hindi films. She is well known for her memorable work in the successful television soaps Sapna Babul Ka... Bidaai, Mrs. Kaushik Ki Paanch Bahuein and Kasam Tere Pyaar Ki. TV actor Puru Chibber is her son.

Career
Vibha graduated as an actor from the National School of Drama in 1986. Since then, she has worked with Barry John, Amal Allana, Kirti Jain, Anuradha Kapoor Prassanna and many other playwrights and directors. She then joined Theatre in Education, a wing of the NSD, as a teacher. She has taught acting to children as well as adults.

Before coming into films & television, she was mainly into theatre. She has worked on the docu-drama "7 Island And A Metro" with director Madhushree Dutta. Vibha has shared screen space on the celluloid with some of the finest actors in the country such as Shahrukh Khan, Rani Mukherjee, Ranbir Kapoor, Asin etc.

Vibha has been giving diction and acting training to actors for a couple of years now. And the actress has some of the most recent additions to Bollywood like Nargis Fakhri, Diana Penty and Giselle Monteiro as all of them have been her students.

Filmography

Television

Films

References

External links

 

Indian television actresses
Living people
Actresses from Mumbai
Indian soap opera actresses
Indian film actresses
Actresses in Hindi cinema
Actresses in Hindi television
21st-century Indian actresses
Year of birth missing (living people)